George James Burke, Sr. (1886 – October 3, 1950) was one of the judges during the Nuremberg Trials.

Burke was born in Ann Arbor, Michigan.  He was the prosecuting attorney of Washtenaw County, Michigan from 1911 to 1914. He is interred at St. Thomas Cemetery in Ann Arbor.

External links
 Burke on Political Graveyard

1886 births
1950 deaths
People from Ann Arbor, Michigan
Judges of the United States Nuremberg Military Tribunals
20th-century American judges